Beesoniidae is a family of scale insects commonly known as beesoniids. They typically cause galls on their plant hosts. Members of this family mostly come from southern Asia. The family name comes from the type genus Beesonia which is named after the entomologist C.F.C. Beeson who obtained the specimens from which they were described and named.

Host species
In the Old World, this members of this family are found on oaks in the genus Quercus and trees in the genera Shorea and Dipterocarpus in the family Dipterocarpaceae. The New World species are parasites of palms.

Life cycle
Most scales in this family have four female instars and five male instars. Members of the genus Gallacoccus have only three female instars however. The females form galls which are often quite ornate. In some species the first instars seem to act as soldiers and attempt to guard the gall. Adult males appear to develop inside the female galls.

Genera
 Beesonia 
 Danumococcus
 Echinogalla
 Gallacoccus
 Limacoccus
 Mangalorea

References

 
Scale insects
Hemiptera families
Neococcoids